The 2019–20 ISU Junior Grand Prix was the 23rd season of a series of junior international competitions organized by the International Skating Union. It was the junior-level complement to the 2019–20 ISU Grand Prix of Figure Skating. Skaters competed for medals in the disciplines of men's singles, ladies' singles, pair skating, and ice dance, as well as for qualifying points. The top six from each discipline qualified for the 2019–20 Junior Grand Prix Final, which was held together with the senior final.

Competitions
The locations of the JGP events change yearly. In the 2019–20 season, the series is composed of the following events in autumn 2019:

Entries
Skaters who reach the age of 13 before July 1, 2019 but have not turned 19 (singles and females of the other two disciplines) or 21 (male pair skaters and ice dancers) are eligible to compete on the junior circuit. Competitors are chosen by their countries according to their federation's selection procedures. The number of entries allotted to each ISU member federation is determined by their skaters' placements at the 2019 World Junior Championships in each discipline.

Number of entries per discipline 
Based on the results of the 2019 World Junior Championships, each ISU member nation can field the following number of entries per event.

Singles and ice dance

Pairs

Medalists

Men

Ladies

Pairs

Ice dance

Medal standings

Qualification 
At each event, skaters earned points toward qualification for the Junior Grand Prix Final. Following the 7th event, the top six highest scoring skaters/teams advanced to the Final. The points earned per placement were as follows:

There were originally seven tie-breakers in cases of a tie in overall points:
 Highest placement at an event. If a skater placed 1st and 3rd, the tiebreaker is the 1st place, and that beats a skater who placed 2nd in both events.
 Highest combined total scores in both events. If a skater earned 200 points at one event and 250 at a second, that skater would win in the second tie-break over a skater who earned 200 points at one event and 150 at another.
 Participated in two events.
 Highest combined scores in the free skating/free dance portion of both events.
 Highest individual score in the free skating/free dance portion from one event.
 Highest combined scores in the short program/short dance of both events.
 Highest number of total participants at the events.

If a tie remained, it was considered unbreakable and the tied skaters all advanced to the Junior Grand Prix Final.

Qualification standings
Bold denotes Junior Grand Prix Final qualification.

Qualifiers

Top JGP scores

Men

Best total score

Best short program score

Best free skating score

Ladies

Best total score

Best short program score

Best free skating score

Pairs

Best total score

Best short program score

Best free skating score

Ice dance

Best total score

Best rhythm dance score

Best free dance score

Prize money 
Each event of the ISU Junior Grand Prix of Figure Skating had a total prize money of U.S. $22,500 (U.S. $15,750 for events without pairs). It was awarded to medalists as follows:

A skater/couple received an extra bonus of U.S. $2,500 for participation in the ISU Junior Grand Prix of Figure Skating Final. The total prize money (U.S. $105,000) was awarded as follows:

References

External links
 ISU Junior Grand Prix at the International Skating Union

 

ISU Junior Grand Prix
Junior Grand Prix
Junior Grand Prix